The buildings at 207–209 South Main St. are two historic commercial buildings located at Hannibal, Marion County, Missouri.  They were built about 1860 and are two two-bay, two-story brick storefront buildings. They have high transom or fascia areas and segmental arched windows on the second story.

It was added to the National Register of Historic Places in 1986.

References

Commercial buildings on the National Register of Historic Places in Missouri
Commercial buildings completed in 1860
Buildings and structures in Hannibal, Missouri
National Register of Historic Places in Marion County, Missouri